The Crimson Canyon is a 1928 American silent Western film directed by Ray Taylor and written by Hugh Nagrom and Carl Krusada. The film stars Ted Wells, Lotus Thompson, Wilbur Mack, Buck Connors and George Atkinson. The film was released on October 14, 1928, by Universal Pictures.

Cast    
 Ted Wells as Phil 'Six Gun' Lang
 Lotus Thompson as Daisy Lanning
 Wilbur Mack as Sam Slade
 Buck Connors as 'Dad' Packard
 George Atkinson as Abner Slade

References

External links
 

1928 films
1928 Western (genre) films
Universal Pictures films
Films directed by Ray Taylor
American black-and-white films
Silent American Western (genre) films
1920s English-language films
1920s American films